WFBY is a classic rock formatted broadcast radio station licensed to Buckhannon, West Virginia, serving Bridgeport, Elkins, Philippi, and Weston in West Virginia. WFBY is owned and operated by West Virginia Radio Corporation.

On January 31, 2018, the then-WBTQ changed their call letters to WFBY and changed their format to classic rock, branded as "The FBY" (format moved from WFBY 102.3 FM Weston, which switched to a simulcast of rock-formatted WCLG-FM 100.1 FM Morgantown under the WBTQ calls).

References

External links
WFBY Online

1984 establishments in West Virginia
Classic rock radio stations in the United States
Radio stations established in 1984
FBY